Sunnen is a St. Louis MetroLink station. It primarily serves Sunnen Business Park, the Sunnen Station apartment development, and southern Maplewood, Missouri. The Sunnen station is adjacent to the only at-grade crossing on the Cross County alignment and is the least used station on the MetroLink system. The station has a commuter parking lot with 96 spaces and includes a kiss-and-ride turnaround.

Station layout
The platforms are accessible by stairs and ramps at each end of the station.

References

External links
 St. Louis Metro

MetroLink stations in St. Louis County, Missouri
Railway stations in the United States opened in 2006
Blue Line (St. Louis MetroLink)
2006 establishments in Missouri